Michael Carter Rallis (born October 10, 1989) is an American professional wrestler and former college football player. He is currently signed to WWE, where he performs on the SmackDown brand under the ring name Madcap Moss.

Early life
Rallis was born and raised in Edina, Minnesota. He attended the University of Minnesota, where he played for the Minnesota Golden Gophers football team between 2008 and 2012. He played outside linebacker for the Golden Gophers and finished third on the team in tackles during his junior year. After graduation, he attended a tryout camp with the Miami Dolphins but was not signed to a contract. In October 2013, Rallis attended a WWE tryout after contacting Jim Ross.

Professional wrestling career

WWE

NXT and 24/7 Champion (2014–2020) 
Rallis signed a developmental contract with WWE in early 2014 and began training at the WWE Performance Center. He made his professional wrestling debut on December 18 at a NXT live event in Tampa, Florida under the ring name Digg Rawlis. He made his televised debut on the May 27, 2015, episode of NXT, working as an enhancement talent alongside Elias Samson in a defeat to Blake and Murphy. Rawlis made further occasional televised appearances as an enhancement talent during 2015, losing to the Hype Bros and Samoa Joe. In August 2015, he adopted the new ring name Riddick Moss, a tribute to former NFL player Randy Moss.

In October 2016, Moss began teaming with Tino Sabbatelli as the God Gifted Athletes; the two competed in the 2016 Dusty Rhodes Tag Team Classic, where they lost in the first round to TM61 on the October 12 episode of NXT. Moss made a further appearance on the January 4, 2017, episode of NXT, again teaming with Sabbatelli and losing to The Revival (Dash Wilder and Scott Dawson). The duo had their first televised victory on the October 25 episode of NXT, defeating Oney Lorcan and Danny Burch. In early 2018, Moss and Sabbatelli entered the Dusty Rhodes Tag Team Classic, losing to Sanity in the first round. On the April 25 episode of NXT, during a match with Heavy Machinery, Sabbatelli ditched Moss, thus ending their alliance. In May, he tore his Achilles tendon, which would require several months to recuperate. Moss returned from injury at a live event on November 30, losing to Matt Riddle after a surprise appearance. In March 2019, he started being managed by Robert Strauss at live events. 

On the January 27, 2020 episode of Raw, Moss made his main roster debut, accompanying Mojo Rawley to the ring for his WWE 24/7 Championship match against No Way Jose, where Moss was billed as Rawley's offensive lineman; Rawley lost the title to R-Truth right after defeating Jose, however, Moss assisted Rawley in regaining the title seconds later. On the February 10 episode of Raw, after they lost to the Street Profits, Moss turned on Rawley and pinned him to win the 24/7 Championship. Moss retained his title against the likes of Rawley, Truth, Cedric Alexander, and Ricochet. On the March 23 episode of Raw, Moss lost the title to Truth while out for a jog, ending his reign at 41 days. On the August 10 episode of Raw, Moss returned in a Raw Underground segment, an underground fight club hosted by Shane McMahon, defeating Cal Bloom by knockout. In October, Moss revealed he had been performing with a torn ACL two months prior.

Storyline with Happy Corbin (2021–2022) 
After a year out of action, in a dark match before the September 17, 2021 episode of SmackDown, Moss returned from injury by defeating Odyssey Jones. The following week on SmackDown, Moss made his televised return, attacking Kevin Owens and aligning with Happy Corbin. The following week, his ring name was changed to Madcap Moss and he began adopting a comic persona. They entered into a feud with Drew McIntyre, mocking him and making jokes at his expense, leading to a match between the two at Day 1 on January 1, 2022, which Moss lost. Moss entered the Royal Rumble match at the namesake event on January 29, entering at #16 and eliminating AJ Styles, but was eliminated by McIntyre. At Elimination Chamber on February 19, Moss lost to McIntyre in a Falls Count Anywhere match. During the match, he took an inverted Alabama Slam, resulting in him landing directly on top of his head, but was able to continue the match. On the April 1 episode of SmackDown, Moss won the 2022 André the Giant Memorial Battle Royal, last eliminating Finn Balor. On the first night of WrestleMania 38 on April 2, Moss accompanied Corbin to the ring for his match against McIntyre, which he lost. 

On the April 8 episode of SmackDown, Corbin blamed Moss for his loss against McIntyre and attacked him, ending their alliance and turning Moss face for the first time in his WWE career. At WrestleMania Backlash on May 8, Moss defeated Corbin. On the May 13 episode of SmackDown, Corbin attacked Moss with the André the Giant Memorial Battle Royal trophy and injured his neck, which left Moss having to be stretchered out of the arena. Moss returned on the June 3 episode of SmackDown with a more serious persona, new entrance music and in-ring attire. At Hell in a Cell on June 5, Moss defeated Corbin in a No Holds Barred match. On the June 17 episode of SmackDown, Moss defeated Corbin for a third time in a Last Laugh match to end their feud.

Singles competition (2022–present) 
On the July 1 episode of SmackDown, Moss defeated Corbin, Ezekiel, and The Miz in a fatal four-way match to qualify for the Money in the Bank ladder match. At the eponymous event on July 2, he failed to win the match. On the August 19 episode of SmackDown, Moss competed in a fatal five way match to determine the #1 contender for the Intercontinental Championship, which was won by Sheamus. At the Clash at the Castle pre-show on September 3, Moss and the Street Profits (Angelo Dawkins and Montez Ford) defeated Alpha Academy (Chad Gable and Otis) and Austin Theory. On the September 16 episode of SmackDown, Moss challenged Solo Sikoa for the NXT North American Championship in a losing effort. On the February 10 episode of SmackDown, Moss defeated Karrion Kross, Santos Escobar, and Rey Mysterio, who Moss pinned, in a fatal four-way match to become the #1 contender for Gunther's Intercontinental Championship. The following week, Moss failed to win the title.

Personal life 
Rallis’ brother, Nick Rallis, is the defensive coordinator for the Arizona Cardinals.

On August 4, 2022, Rallis revealed that he is dating Australian professional wrestler Tenille Dashwood, who wrestles in WWE under the ring name Emma.

Championships and accomplishments
Pro Wrestling Illustrated
Ranked No. 244 of the top 500 singles wrestlers in the PWI 500 in 2022
 WWE
 WWE 24/7 Championship (1 time)
 André the Giant Memorial Battle Royal (2022)

References

External links 
 
 
 
 

American male professional wrestlers
Players of American football from Minnesota
American football defensive linemen
American football linebackers
1989 births
Living people
WWE 24/7 Champions
21st-century professional wrestlers